{{Automatic taxobox
|image = Isatis tinctoria02.JPG
|image_caption = Isatis tinctoria
|taxon = Isatis
|authority = L.
|subdivision_ranks = Species
|subdivision = About 30 species, including:
Isatis boissierianaIsatis glaucaIsatis tinctoriaothers (see text)
| synonyms = 
|synonyms_ref =
}}Isatis is a genus of flowering plants in the family Brassicaceae, native to the Mediterranean region east to central Asia. Its genus name, Isatis, derives from the ancient Greek word for the plant, ἰσάτις. The genus includes woad (Isatis tinctoria). Due to their extremely variable morphology, the Asian species in particular are difficult to determine; the only reliable diagnostic feature is the ripe fruit. They are (usually) biennial or perennial herbaceous plants, often bluish and hairless or downy hairy with the upright stem branched.

Description
They are annual, biennial or perennial, branched herbs, usually glabrous and glaucous except silique. Basal leaves generally elliptic-oblong, sessile; sessile caulinary, rounded to oval-oblong.

The hermaphrodite flowers are fourfold double perianth. The four sepals are ascending to upright. The four yellow to off-white or lilac-white petals are at least as long as the sepals. They have six stamens with very small, egg-shaped or elongated-round anthers. There are nectar glands. Racemose is branched or paniculated, ebracted, inflorescence, often reaching lax and elongated in the fruit.

The fruit is a generally linear silique, oblong-cuneate to suborbicular, indehiscent, flattened laterally, unilocular, little to conspicuously winged, glabrous or with tiny hairs.

Species
Currently accepted species include:Isatis afghanica Hadac & ChrtekIsatis amani P.H.DavisIsatis apennina Ten. ex GrandeIsatis apscheronica N.BuschIsatis aptera (Boiss. & Heldr.) Al-Shehbaz, Moazzeni & Mumm.Isatis arenaria Azn.Isatis armena L.Isatis arnoldiana N.BuschIsatis aucheri Boiss.Isatis biscutellifolia Boiss. & BuhseIsatis bitlisica P.H.DavisIsatis boissieriana Rchb.f.Isatis brachycarpa C.A.Mey.Isatis brevipes (Bunge) JafriIsatis bullata Aitch. & Hemsl.Isatis bungeana SeidlitzIsatis buschiana Schischk.Isatis callifera Boiss. & BalansaIsatis campylocarpa Boiss.Isatis canaliculata (Vassilcz.) V.V.Botschantz.Isatis candolleana Boiss.Isatis cappadocica Desv.Isatis cardiocarpa (Trautv.) Al-Shehbaz, Moazzeni & Mumm.Isatis caucasica N.BuschIsatis cochlearis Boiss.Isatis constricta P.H.DavisIsatis costata C.A.Mey.Isatis davisiana H.Misirdali ex P.H.Davis, R.R.Mill & Kit TanIsatis demiriziana H.Misirdali ex P.H.Davis, R.R.Mill & Kit TanIsatis densiflora (Bunge ex Boiss.) D.A.GermanIsatis deserti (N.Busch) V.V.Botschantz.Isatis djurjaedae Coss. & DurieuIsatis elegans (Boiss.) Hadac & ChrtekIsatis emarginata Kar. & Kir.Isatis erzurumica P.H.DavisIsatis floribunda Boiss. ex Bornm.Isatis frigida Boiss. & KotschyIsatis frutescens Kar. & Kir.Isatis gaubae Bornm.Isatis glastifolia (Fisch. & C.A.Mey.) Al-Shehbaz, Moazzeni & Mumm.Isatis glauca Aucher ex Boiss.Isatis grammotis Kit TanIsatis gymnocarpa (Fisch. ex DC.) Al-Shehbaz, Moazzeni & Mumm.Isatis harsukhii O.E.SchulzIsatis hirtocalyx Franch.Isatis huber-morathii P.H.DavisIsatis iberica StevenIsatis jacutensis (N.Busch) N.BuschIsatis karjaginii Schischk.Isatis kotschyana Boiss. & Hohen.Isatis kozlovskyi Grossh.Isatis laevigata Trautv.Isatis latisiliqua StevenIsatis leuconeura Boiss. & BuhseIsatis littoralis StevenIsatis lockmanniana Kotschy ex Boiss.Isatis lusitanica L.Isatis mardinensis P.H.Davis & H.MisirdaliIsatis maxima PavlovIsatis microcarpa J.Gay ex Boiss.Isatis minima BungeIsatis multicaulis (Kar. & Kir.) JafriIsatis oblongata DC.Isatis odontogera (Bordz.) D.A.GermanIsatis ornithorhynchus N.BuschIsatis pachycarpa Rech.f., Aellen & Esfand.Isatis pinnatiloba P.H.DavisIsatis platyloba Link ex Steud.Isatis praecox Kit. ex Tratt.Isatis raimondoi Di Grist., Scafidi & DominaIsatis raphanifolia Boiss.Isatis rugulosa Bunge ex Boiss.Isatis sabulosa Steven ex Ledeb.Isatis sevangensis N.BuschIsatis sivasica P.H.DavisIsatis spatella P.H.DavisIsatis spectabilis P.H.DavisIsatis steveniana Trautv.Isatis stocksii Boiss.Isatis subdidyma (N.Busch) V.E.Avet.Isatis takhtajanii Avet.Isatis tinctoria L.Isatis tomentella Boiss. & BalansaIsatis trachycarpa Trautv.Isatis turcomanica Korsh.Isatis undulata Aucher ex Boiss.Isatis violascens BungeIsatis zarrei'' Al-Shehbaz, Moazzeni & Mumm.

References

Brassicaceae
Brassicaceae genera